Boskin or Boškin is a surname. Notable people with this surname include:

Angela Boškin (1885–1977), Slovenian nurse and social worker
 Edward J. Boskin, pseudonym of Edward Mylius (1878–1947), Belgian-born journalist jailed in England in 1911 for libel against King George V
Joseph Boskin Boston Universitu professor emeritus in history
Michael Boskin (born 1945), T. M. Friedman Professor of Economics and senior Fellow at Stanford University's Hoover Institution

See also
Boskin Commission, formed in 1995 and chaired by Michael Boskin